Lennart Lind may refer to 
Lennart Lind (athlete) (Lennart Gustaf Lind, born 1930), Swedish pole vaulter
Lennart Lind (wrestler) (Gustaf Lennart Lind, 1893–1961), Finnish wrestler